Higlada is a small village in Somali Region, Ethiopia. It's located near the border between Somaliland and Ethiopia and it is controlled by both sides. The Ethiopian side is under the Daroor District in the Somali Region of Ethiopia and other side is under the Salahley district in Maroodi Jeex, Somaliland. The village is a hub for traffic movement and a port for the Somali region of Ethiopia.

References

Geography of Somaliland
Populated places in the Somali Region